"Mandolin Rain" is the third track from The Way It Is, the debut album for Bruce Hornsby and the Range. The song was co-written by Bruce Hornsby and his brother John, and featured Range member David Mansfield on the title instrument.

Background
It appears to be partly inspired by the song "You Don't Miss Your Water" by William Bell due to it employing the same hook (heard at the beginning of both songs), and by a similar swing feel (albeit with different chords).

Co-writer of the song John Hornsby said the song is about missing someone badly. "...it’s about trying to pull through when so many things remind you of her – a tune, a ferry whistle, mainly a summer storm."

Charts
The song, released in late 1986, peaked at number four on the Billboard Hot 100 in March 1987, following on the success of their previous single, the #1 hit and title track to their debut album, "The Way It Is". It also reached number one on the adult contemporary chart for three weeks, and number two on the Mainstream Rock Tracks chart for two weeks, also in early 1987. The song peaked at number 38 on the country chart.

References

External links
 Bruce Hornsby Artist Biography

1986 singles
Bruce Hornsby songs
Songs written by Bruce Hornsby
Songs written by John Hornsby
RCA Records singles